Gládson Silva Barbosa (born 16 August 1979) is a Brazilian athlete who specialises in the 3000 metres steeplechase. He has won multiple medals at the regional level.

Competition record

Personal bests
1500 metres – 3:50.94 (Uberlândia 2007)
2000 metres – 5:08.63 (Fortaleza 2008)
3000 metres – 8:05.88 (São Paulo 2008)
5000 metres – 14:03.59 (Fortaleza 2007)
3000 metres steeplechase – 8:35.77 (Neerpelt 2008)

References

1979 births
Living people
Brazilian male steeplechase runners
Athletes (track and field) at the 2007 Pan American Games
Pan American Games athletes for Brazil
21st-century Brazilian people
20th-century Brazilian people